Wearmouth may refer to:

Places
 Sunderland, Tyne and Wear, United Kingdom
 Bishopwearmouth
 Monkwearmouth
 Monkwearmouth–Jarrow Abbey (the Monkwearmouth part)
 Wearmouth Bridge
 Wearmouth Colliery

People
 Ronnie Wearmouth, Australian rules footballer
 Dick Wearmouth (1926–2012), Australian rules footballer
 Jim Wearmouth (1909–1989), Australian rugby league player
 Joe Wearmouth (1878–1925), Australian rules football player